Mums or MUMS may refer to:
 Mothers (in colloquial British and Commonwealth English usage)
 Chrysanthemums, a genus of flowering plants
 muMs da Schemer, an American actor
 Mums Records, a record label
 Makerere University School of Medicine, in Uganda
 Mashhad University of Medical Sciences, in Iran
 , a Chilean LGBT rights organization

See also 
 Mum (disambiguation)